Janusz Zarenkiewicz (born August 3, 1959) is a Polish former amateur boxer. He won a bronze medal in the super-heavyweight division at the 1988 Summer Olympics, where he forfeited his semi-final fight to eventual gold medallist Lennox Lewis. Zarenkiewicz also won bronze at the 1985 European Championships, and was a five-time Polish national champion.

Olympic results
First-round bye
Defeated Harold Arroyo (Puerto Rico), 5–0
Defeated Andreas Schnieders (West Germany), 3–2
Lost to Lennox Lewis (Canada), walkover

References

1959 births
Living people
Super-heavyweight boxers
Olympic boxers of Poland
Olympic bronze medalists for Poland
Boxers at the 1988 Summer Olympics
Olympic medalists in boxing
Medalists at the 1988 Summer Olympics
People from Nysa County
Sportspeople from Opole Voivodeship
Polish male boxers
20th-century Polish people
21st-century Polish people